Steele Sidebottom (born 2 January 1991) is a professional Australian rules football player currently playing for the Collingwood Football Club in the Australian Football League.

Sidebottom was selected by Collingwood with selection 11 in the 2008 AFL Draft. Sidebottom had a 10-goal best-on-ground performance in the 2008 TAC Cup Grand Final. He is strong overhead and in one-on-one contests. An AIS/AFL Academy graduate and Vic Country representative in 2008, Sidebottom also was selected in the All-Australian team following the 2008 AFL Under 18 Championships.

A midfielder, Sidebottom became a star player for Collingwood. He has won the Copeland Trophy twice as the club's best and fairest (2017, 2018) and also played in a premiership in 2010. Sidebottom has been named in the All-Australian team in 2018 on a wing in addition to finishing second in the 2018 Brownlow Medal. He has been the co-vice captain of Collingwood since the 2015 season.

Career

Sidebottom made his AFL debut vs St Kilda in Round 7 2009 where St Kilda defeated Collingwood by 88 points.

In the Semi Final vs Adelaide of the 2009 AFL Season, Sidebottom had his first breakthrough where he notched up 25 disposals in a come from behind win.

In 2010 Sidebottom played in all but one game for the Magpies including both the drawn Grand Final and Grand Final replay. At 19-years of age he was the youngest member of Collingwood's 2010 Premiership side.

On 6 October 2017, Sidebottom won the Copeland Trophy.

In the 2018 Brownlow Medal count, Sidebottom finished in second place (his career best).

Statistics
Updated to the end of the 2022 season.

|-
| 2009 ||  || 22
| 11 || 3 || 3 || 82 || 85 || 167 || 42 || 44 || 0.3 || 0.3 || 7.5 || 7.7 || 15.2 || 3.8 || 4.0 || 0
|- 
| 2010 ||  || 22
| 25 || 24 || 13 || 253 || 209 || 462 || 105 || 101 || 1.0 || 0.5 || 10.1 || 8.4 || 18.5 || 4.2 || 4.0 || 1
|-
| 2011 ||  || 22
| 25 || 25 || 13 || 275 || 214 || 489 || 128 || 107 || 1.0 || 0.5 || 11.0 || 8.6 || 19.6 || 5.1 || 4.3 || 4
|- 
| 2012 ||  || 22
| 24 || 14 || 13 || 377 || 258 || 635 || 133 || 89 || 0.6 || 0.5 || 15.7 || 10.8 || 26.5 || 5.5 || 3.7 || 7
|-
| 2013 ||  || 22
| 23 || 19 || 10 || 361 || 194 || 555 || 120 || 77 || 0.8 || 0.4 || 15.7 || 8.4 || 24.1 || 5.2 || 3.3 || 7
|- 
| 2014 ||  || 22
| 19 || 14 || 14 || 327 || 181 || 508 || 109 || 78 || 0.7 || 0.7 || 17.2 || 9.5 || 26.7 || 5.7 || 4.1 || 9
|-
| 2015 ||  || 22
| 16 || 7 || 8 || 251 || 186 || 437 || 85 || 53 || 0.4 || 0.5 || 15.7 || 11.6 || 27.3 || 5.3 || 3.3 || 9
|- 
| 2016 ||  || 22
| 20 || 17 || 7 || 273 || 241 || 514 || 108 || 90 || 0.9 || 0.4 || 13.7 || 12.1 || 25.7 || 5.4 || 4.5 || 7
|-
| 2017 ||  || 22
| 22 || 16 || 9 || 344 || 256 || 600 || 115 || 93 || 0.7 || 0.4 || 15.6 || 11.6 || 27.3 || 5.2 || 4.2 || 14
|- 
| 2018 ||  || 22
| 26 || 12 || 14 || 361 || 403 || 764 || 133 || 96 || 0.5 || 0.5 || 13.9 || 15.5 || 29.4 || 5.1 || 3.7 || 24
|-
| 2019 ||  || 22
| 23 || 10 || 7 || 339 || 253 || 592 || 141 || 84 || 0.4 || 0.3 || 14.7 || 11.0 || 25.7 || 6.1 || 3.7 || 7
|- 
| 2020 ||  || 22
| 9 || 5 || 3 || 112 || 101 || 213 || 33 || 38 || 0.6 || 0.3 || 12.4 || 11.2 || 23.7 || 3.7 || 4.2 || 6
|-
| 2021 ||  || 22
| 21 || 8 || 5 || 272 || 228 || 500 || 114 || 62 || 0.4 || 0.2 || 13.0 || 10.9 || 23.8 || 5.4 || 3.0 || 0
|-
| 2022 ||  || 22
| 25 || 12 || 7 || 274 || 175 || 449 || 110 || 74 || 0.5 || 0.3 || 11.0 || 7.0 || 18.0 || 4.4 || 3.0 || 3
|- class=sortbottom
! colspan=3 | Career
! 289 !! 186 !! 126 !! 3901 !! 2984 !! 6885 !! 1476 !! 1086 !! 0.6 !! 0.4 !! 13.5 !! 10.3 !! 23.8 !! 5.1 !! 3.8 !! 98
|}

Notes

Honours and achievements
Collingwood
 AFL Premiership (Collingwood): 2010
 McClelland Trophy (Collingwood): 2010, 2011

Individual
 All-Australian team: 2018
 2× Copeland Trophy: 2017, 2018
 Collingwood co-vice captain: 2015–
 Gary Ayres Award: 2018
 Anzac Day Medal: 2016 (round 5)
 2× 22under22 team: 2012, 2013

Personal life

His older brother Ryan plays cricket for the Victorian Bushrangers.

References

External links

 
 

Collingwood Football Club players
Collingwood Football Club Premiership players
Copeland Trophy winners
1991 births
Living people
Australian people of English descent
Australian rules footballers from Victoria (Australia)
Murray Bushrangers players
All-Australians (AFL)
One-time VFL/AFL Premiership players